Koiragawa Dam is an earthfill dam located in Yamagata Prefecture in Japan. The dam is used for irrigation. The catchment area of the dam is 4.1 km2. The dam impounds about 5  ha of land when full and can store 358 thousand cubic meters of water. The construction of the dam was started on 1963 and completed in 1965.

References

Dams in Yamagata Prefecture
1965 establishments in Japan